Dahraz is a village de facto in the Askeran Province of the breakaway Republic of Artsakh, de jure in the Khojavend District of Azerbaijan, in the disputed region of Nagorno-Karabakh.

History 
During the Soviet period, the village was a part of the Askeran District of the Nagorno-Karabakh Autonomous Oblast.

Economy and culture 
The population is mainly engaged in agriculture and animal husbandry. The village is part of the community of Sarnaghbyur.

Demographics 
The village has an ethnic Armenian-majority population, had 8 inhabitants in 2005, and 5 inhabitants in 2015.

References

External links 
 

Populated places in Askeran Province
Populated places in Khojaly District